UNESCO Artists for Peace are international celebrity advocates for the United Nations agency UNESCO. This category of advocate is intended to heighten public awareness in addition to the categories UNESCO Goodwill Ambassador and UNESCO Champion for Sport. The programme started in 1995.

Current list
The following is a list of current UNESCO Artists for Peace:

References

External links
  (current list)

Artist for Peace
Goodwill ambassador programmes
United Nations goodwill ambassadors